Constantino Prinetti (1830–1855) was an Italian landscape painter.

He was born at Canobbio. After studying at the Milan Academy under Giuseppe Canella.
He travelled in Germany, the Netherlands, Paris, Normandy, England, and Scotland. He died at Milan. 
Among his works are: 
The Brienzer See (1853 and 1855) 
The Battlefield of Näfels (1854), engraved by Salathé. 
Dundas Castle
The Thames and Houses of Parliament Street in Edinburgh
Street in Edinburgh
Valsasina
November Sun on Lago Maggiore
Monte di Colico
Grotto of Catullus on Lago di Garda 
View of Edinburgh (1855)

References

19th-century Italian painters
Italian male painters
Landscape artists
Painters from Milan
Brera Academy alumni
1830 births
1855 deaths
19th-century Italian male artists